Dublin County F.C. was an Irish association football club based in Dublin. The club made an unsuccessful application to participate in the 2021 League of Ireland First Division.

History 
Dublin County FC were backed by a group of investors calling themselves Irish Sea FC, a group that launched an ultimately unsuccessful effort to buy Cabinteely in 2020. Among the group's directors are former Sunderland captain Chris Makin, ex-Crystal Palace player Jamie Fullarton, American coach Dennis Lukens, and Alex and Sibrena Geraldino, co-owners of American club New Jersey Teamsterz. The latter are a married couple who quit their respective jobs to fulfil their dream of owning a football club, and took part in a Discovery Channel documentary called “I Quit” which followed the progress of selected entrepreneurs starting new ventures.

Alex and Sibrena Geraldino are currently co-owners of the New Jersey Teamsterz, who compete in the National Independent Soccer Association (NISA), the third tier of U.S soccer. They spoke on the BSMA podcast on how their Irish project intended to be used as a pathway to Europe for their U.S players, while also facilitating Irish-based players to head in the opposite direction. They recruited Dennis Lukens to oversee operations in Ireland as they began the application process with the FAI. It was also their intention to allow Lukens to manage the side, with previous experience managing teams in the United States and Ukraine. In 2021, Lukens began to recruit players primarily from Armenian First League side, Noravank SC. Other players from the lower leagues of Armenian and Ukrainian football were also approached about playing for Dublin County. A preliminary squad list was published on the Dublin County website in early 2021, containing players Gor Martirosyan, Norayr Nikoghosyan, Robert Marutyan, David Quaye, Christian Boateng, Adam Kavanagh, Benjamin Nana Techie, Vigen Begoyan, Edward Carthy, Aram Shakhnazaryan and Alan Tsabiev as signed for the 2021 season. The club played several friendly matches against local Dublin sides from late 2020 to early 2021.

Stadium issues and unsuccessful licence bid 
On 22 February 2021, it was reported that management of Morton Stadium reneged on a deal at the very last minute. The apparent reasons provided were suggestions of mounting pressure from the Athletics Community to retain exclusive use of the stadium grounds in the build-up to the delayed 2020 Olympic Games in Tokyo. That evening, Lukens told The Irish Times that he would consult with his legal advisors as to whether there is a basis to pursue the matter but he described the organisation's behaviour as “absolutely unacceptable and unprofessional”. Dublin County were informed at 2:43pm that the stadium would not be made available to them for use. With no alternative stadium available and the FAI deadline at 4:30pm the very same day, it left Dublin County without a home ground. The club were left frustrated at the outcome as they already had two full-time staff and 20 player contracts signed in the lead up to the season.

Treaty United were given their place as a 10-team First Division was finalised for 2021. It remains unclear whether Dublin County will apply to participate in future seasons.

References

Association football clubs in Dublin (city)